Paul McGrath (born 4 December 1959) is an Irish former professional footballer, who played as a defender. Mainly a centre back, he also played as defensive midfielder. McGrath is widely considered to be one of the greatest Irish players of all time. He spent the majority of his career at Aston Villa and Manchester United (seven seasons apiece). He is one of only six defenders to have won the PFA Players' Player of the Year award. He also played for St Patrick's Athletic, Derby County and Sheffield United.

Also a long-time member of the Republic of Ireland national team, he appeared at the 1990 and 1994 FIFA World Cups, as well as UEFA Euro 1988, the team's first-ever international tournament.

Early life
McGrath was born in Greenford, Middlesex, to a Nigerian father who met his Irish mother during his medical studies in Dublin. His father disappeared soon after his conception. His mother, Betty McGrath, was terrified that her father would find out she had become pregnant outside marriage and in an interracial relationship. She travelled in secret to London to have her child, who was considered illegitimate. She was strongly advised to give her son up for adoption at the Mother and Baby home in Acton, where she refused to do so numerous times. Upon her arrival back in her hometown Paul was forcibly taken away from her, placed with a foster family and later transferred to the Smyly Trust Home. This was arranged and carried out by the Catholic Crusade members in Dublin. It was assumed that Betty McGrath gave him up for fostering in Ireland when he was four weeks old.

When he was five years old, one of the daughters of the family he had been fostered by came to Betty to say they could not control him. At that stage his mother had him back for a number of days before having to put him into an orphanage. Despite being Paul McGrath on his birth certificate, the admission form required the name of the father, hence he was known as Paul Nwobilo for a time.

Club career

St Patrick's Athletic

McGrath made his debut in a League of Ireland Cup clash with the Shamrock Rovers on 30 August 1981 at Richmond Park. Manager Charlie Walker stated in his notes in the match programme that "Since the end of last season I have been acquiring new players: three are local lads from junior clubs- Billy Reid (Fatima Rangers), Paul McGrath (Dalkey United) and John Cleary (Ballyfermot United). Given a time and a little encouragement I feel that by the end of the season they will have done the club proud." He ultimately excelled at The Saints, earning the nickname "The Black Pearl of Inchicore".

Manchester United
In 1982, McGrath moved to Manchester United, then managed by Ron Atkinson. He missed out on a place in the FA Cup victory over Brighton & Hove Albion the following year, but soon ousted Gordon McQueen to become the regular partner to Kevin Moran in the centre of defence.

In 1985–86, it appeared that McGrath was on course to pick up a league title medal after United won their first 10 league games of the season, but injuries to key players including Bryan Robson soon took their toll on the side and they eventually finished fourth in the table, 12 points behind champions Liverpool. A dismal start to the 1986–87 season saw Ron Atkinson sacked as manager and replaced by Alex Ferguson in November 1986, but McGrath initially remained a regular member of the first team. United finished second behind Liverpool in the league a year later.

By the 1988–89 season, McGrath was struggling with knee injuries and was becoming a less regular member of the first team, facing competition from new signings Steve Bruce and Mal Donaghy. His relationship with manager Ferguson was becoming strained.

Aston Villa
During the late 1980s McGrath was offered terms at S.S.C. Napoli, but the deal did not come to fruition. McGrath signed for Aston Villa in August 1989. While at Villa, McGrath played some of the best football of his career, despite recurrent problems in his knees. Villa came close to winning the title in McGrath's first season, finishing second to Liverpool. The next season saw the club fighting relegation for much of the campaign, after boss Graham Taylor left to take control of England. Despite the managerial upheaval, McGrath's performances continued to impress. Under Jozef Vengloš, the first top flight manager to hail from the European mainland, McGrath became a consistent mainstay of the Villa line up. After Vengloš' solitary season (1990–91) at Villa, Ron Atkinson took over, building one of the finest sides of the early Premier League era. In the inaugural season of the Premier League (1992–93), Aston Villa again finished as runners-up, behind Manchester United. As a sign of the regard he was now held in by his fellow professionals, McGrath won the PFA Players' Player of the Year award at the end of the season.

Later career
He played his final game as a professional for Sheffield United against Ipswich Town on 9 November 1997, just before his 38th birthday. He officially retired at the end of the season.

International career
In 1990, the Republic of Ireland qualified for its first FIFA World Cup, in 1990 in Italy, eventually reaching the quarter-finals, where they lost to the hosts (1–0 in Rome), with McGrath ever present in the lineups (five matches, 480 minutes played). He captained the team four times in 1992 after the retirement of Mick McCarthy.

In the Republic of Ireland's opening game of the 1994 World Cup – a 1–0 win against favourites Italy, thanks to Ray Houghton's early goal – in a perfect example of his commitment to the game, McGrath put up an astonishing defensive performance in spite of excruciating knee problems, including blocking a shot from Roberto Baggio with his face.

Post-professional football life
McGrath suffers from alcoholism, and missed occasional matches as a result. In an interview with FourFourTwo, he admitted to playing football while still under the influence of alcohol; additionally, his recurrent knee problems resulted in him undergoing a total of eight operations during his career. McGrath's autobiography, Back from the Brink, co-written with journalist Vincent Hogan, was the inaugural winner of the William Hill Irish Sports Book of the Year (2006).

Upon retiring, he settled in Monageer, County Wexford. In 2004, one year after being taken to court, charged with a breach of the peace, McGrath returned to the football world after five years, moving to Waterford United in Ireland as director of football.

In 2011, McGrath recorded a cover version of the Gerry Goffin and Carole King song "Goin' Back". He followed that single up with an 11 track album released in 2011 with profits going to his two designated charities the Acquired Brain Injury Foundation and the Cystic Fibrosis Foundation of Ireland.

On 29 June 2013, McGrath was arrested over an alleged public order offence at a hotel in County Offaly. He was bailed and appeared at Tullamore district court on 17 July.

Career statistics

Club

International

Honours
Manchester United
FA Cup: 1984–85

Aston Villa
Football League Cup: 1993–94, 1995–96

Individual
PFAI Players' Player of the Year: 1982
PFA Team of the Year: 1985–86 First Division, 1992–93 Premier League
FAI Senior International Player of the Year: 1990, 1991
PFA Players' Player of the Year: 1993
Football League 100 Legends: 1998 (inducted)
English Football Hall of Fame: 2015 (inducted)
FAI Hall of Fame: 2020 (inducted)

See also
 List of people on the postage stamps of Ireland 
 List of Republic of Ireland international footballers born outside the Republic of Ireland

References
Specific

General
 

1959 births
1990 FIFA World Cup players
1994 FIFA World Cup players
21st-century Irish male singers
Association football defenders
Aston Villa F.C. players
Black Irish sportspeople
Citizens of Ireland through descent
Derby County F.C. players
English Football Hall of Fame inductees
English Football League players
FA Cup Final players
Irish autobiographers
Irish people of Nigerian descent
Irish sportspeople of African descent
League of Ireland players
Living people
Manchester United F.C. players
People from Greenford
Premier League players
Republic of Ireland association footballers
Republic of Ireland international footballers
Sheffield United F.C. players
St Patrick's Athletic F.C. players
UEFA Euro 1988 players